Haldia International Sports City is under-construction sport city in Haldia, West Bengal. It will be India's first planned city developed and aimed for sports. Haldia International Sports City will be replica of Dubai Sports City. Shristi Infrastructure Development Corporation Ltd, a subsidiary of Srei Capital, is the developer.

Haldia International Sports City will be consist of 40,000 seater-outdoor cricket stadium will hold 40,000 people, while the indoor stadium will seat 5,000. Apart from this attractions of the sports city shopping mall and multiplex as well as all required amenity for today's modern living.

References

External links 
 Wikimapia

Sports venues in Kolkata
Cricket grounds in West Bengal
Proposed populated places
Stadiums under construction
Haldia
Proposed sports venues in India